Vladimir Sergeyvich Pecherin (Владимир Сергеевич Печерин) (27 June 1807 – 28 April 1885), was a controversial Russian political figure both in 19th-century Ireland and in Russia. A rebellious writer and Romantic lyricist poet that rejected despotism, his writings in his autobiographical notes and in his letters to other Russians provide a historical context to the evolution of Russian intellectual thought of the 1860s and 1870s. Pecherin's writings present the Russian Zeitgeist of the period artistically.

Early years
Pecherin was born in the town of Velyka Dymerka in the Russian Empire (modern-day Ukraine) on 27 June 1807. He was raised in the Russian Orthodox Church.

Pecherin was attracted to the moral and religious ideology of Utopian Socialism. He entered Moscow University, as a student of classical languages, and he wrote manuscripts of poetry that circulated among his university companions. Pecherin was sent abroad for two years on a government scholarship to complete his education.

In 1835, after returning to Moscow University from his travels, even before completing his degree, Pecherin was appointed as Professor of Greek Language and antiquities. After one term, in 1836, he left Russia to pursue radical politics in Europe. In a letter explaining to the authorities, Pecherin stated that he would never return to a country among whose inhabitants it was impossible to find the imprint of their Creator. He is considered by some to have been the first Russian political emigrant.

Self-exile
In 1840, after four years of exploring Europe, at times reduced to complete poverty, Pecherin unexpectedly converted to Catholicism and became a member of the  Redemptorists whose mission was to work among the poor. He lived in a monastery in Clapham, near London and later in Ireland.

In 1855, he was the last person to be tried for blasphemy in Ireland. The trial, which was a major public event, took place at Kingston (now Dún Laoghaire) for allegedly burning Protestant Bibles with many works of immoral literature on Guy Fawkes Day. Despite many witnesses, the case was not proven and Pecherin's acquittal was raucously celebrated by his followers.

Later life
In 1862, after 20 years of service as a missionary, Pecherin left the Redemptorists. He spent the last 23 years of his life serving as a chaplain at the Mater Hospital in Dublin, Ireland. During his time in Dublin, he wrote his memoirs, Apologia pro vita mea (Notes from Beyond the Tomb). His memoirs were so controversial, critical of both the Russian government and the Catholic Church of the time, that they were not published in Russia until a hundred years after his death. They contain an account of his experiences in Europe, particularly in Belgium, after leaving Russia, and his fight against poverty.

Pecherin died in Dublin on 29 April 1885.

Quotes
"How sweet it is to hate one's native land and avidly desire its ruin - and in its ruin to discern the dawn of universal rebirth."

In popular culture
Pecherin's philosophy influenced Fyodor Dostoevsky and it is believed that Dostoevsky's anti-materialist "one secluded thinker" in The Idiot is an allusion to Pecherin.

In the movie The Russia House, starring Sean Connery, Klaus Maria Brandauer's character "Dante," a Russian scientist, quotes Pecherin.

References

1807 births
1885 deaths
People from Kyiv Oblast
People from Ostyorsky Uyezd
Russians in Ukraine
19th-century Roman Catholic priests from the Russian Empire
Former Russian Orthodox Christians
Converts to Roman Catholicism from Eastern Orthodoxy
Emigrants from the Russian Empire to the United Kingdom
Russian male poets
Russian Catholic poets
19th-century poets
Redemptorists
19th-century male writers from the Russian Empire